In 917, the group of Danes who had previously been based in Huntingdon relocated to Tempsford in Bedfordshire, together with other Danes from East Anglia. They built and fortified a new burh there, to serve as a forward base for attacks on English territory. Later that year, after launching an unsuccessful attack on Bedford, they were attacked by an English army from the territories of King Edward the Elder, as part of his widespread offensive which in that year overwhelmed the Danish territories in East Anglia and south-eastern Mercia. The burh was stormed and a Danish king, probably that of East Anglia, was killed, along with the Jarls Toglos and Manna and many of their followers, while the rest were captured.

References

910s conflicts
Battles involving the Anglo-Saxons
Battles involving the Vikings
Battles involving Denmark
917
10th century in England
Military history of Bedfordshire
Kingdom of East Anglia